Lampredotto is a typical Florentine dish, made from the fourth and final stomach of cattle, the abomasum.

"Lampredotto" is derived from the Italian word for lamprey eels, lampreda, as the tripe resembles a lamprey in shape and color.

A sandwich with lampredotto—panino co i' lampredotto—has been described as a "classic Florentine" sandwich and is a traditional regional street food in Florence. Lampredotto is typically slow-cooked in a vegetable broth, seasoned with herbs, chopped, and served in a bread roll. It is often topped with a spicy sauce or a green sauce (salsa verde). 

The Daily Meal has called lampredotto "a tripe-lover's dream."

References 

Culture in Florence
Cuisine of Tuscany
Offal sandwiches